Taboão da Serra is a municipality in the state of São Paulo in Brazil. It is part of the Metropolitan Region of São Paulo. The population is 293,652 (2020 est.) in an area of 20.39 km². It is the second smallest city in area in the São Paulo Metropolitan Area (RMSP).

Geography

Climate 
The city's climate, as in the whole Greater São Paulo, has a monsoon-influenced humid subtropical climate (Cfa), according to the Köppen classification. Summers are rainy and not too warm. The winters are rainless and not too cold.
The year average temperature is 63.5 (17.5 Cº), and the coldest month is July (Average 55.4 [13 °C]). The hottest month is February with an average temperature of 71.6 (22 °C). Rainfall is abundant, amounting to an annual average of 1,400 millimetres (57.2 in).

References

Municipalities in São Paulo (state)